This was the tournament's first edition.
Second seeds Nicole Clerico and Anastasiya Vasylyeva won the title, defeating top seeds Nina Bratchikova and Ksenia Palkina in the final, 4–6, 6–3, [13–11].

Seeds

  Nina Bratchikova /  Ksenia Palkina (final)
  Nicole Clerico /  Anastasiya Vasylyeva (champions)
  Shiho Hisamatsu /  Miki Miyamura (first round)
  Keren Shlomo /  Poojashree Venkatesha (quarterfinals)

Draw

Draw

References

External links
 Draw

2009 Women's Doubles
Necc-Itf Women's Tennis Championships - Women's Doubles
Necc-Itf Women's Tennis Championships - Women's Doubles